The Ministry of Social Policy of Ukraine, formerly the Ministry of Labor and Social Policy, is the Ukrainian government department responsible for instituting labor relations, family and children, immigration and trafficking, women's rights, children's rights, and humanitarian aid.

Specialization
 Population Employment and Labor Migration
 Work Relationships
 Populations Social Security
 Family and Children Affairs
 Rights Security of the Deported by National Identity People which returned to Ukraine
 Ensuring the equal rights and possibilities for women and men
 Prevention of violence in family

Structures
The ministry consists of the central body of ministry headed by its leadership composed of a minister, his/hers first deputy, and other deputies in assistance to the minister. Part of ministry compose several state administrations that are specialized in certain field and coordinate operations of government companies.

State agencies
 State Service for disabled and veterans of Ukraine
 State Inspection of Ukraine in labor affairs
 State Employment Service
System of State Social Security
 State Social Security Fund in case of Unemployment
 Social Security Fund for temporary Disability
 Social Security Fund for industrial Accidents
 Pension Fund of Ukraine

List of Ministers

See also
Cabinet of Ministers of Ukraine

References

External links 
 

Social Policy
Social Policy
Ukraine, Social Policy
Ukraine
2010 establishments in Ukraine
Ukraine